The year 1729 in architecture involved some significant events.

Buildings and structures

Buildings

 February 3 – The foundation stone is laid for the new Irish Houses of Parliament on College Green in Dublin, designed by Edward Lovett Pearce MP as the world's first purpose-built bicameral legislative building.
 Completion of Castletown House, Celbridge, County Kildare, Ireland's first Palladian mansion, designed by Alessandro Galilei and Edward Lovett Pearce for William Conolly, Speaker of the Irish House of Commons.
 Completion of Kinlet Hall, Shropshire, England, designed by Francis Smith of Warwick.
 Completion of Marble Hill House, Twickenham, near London, designed by Roger Morris.
 Completion of Sutton Scarsdale Hall, Derbyshire, England, designed by Francis Smith of Warwick.
 Christ Church, Spitalfields, and St George in the East in London, designed by Nicholas Hawksmoor, are completed  for the Commission for Building Fifty New Churches.
 Chiswick House in London is designed by Richard Boyle, 3rd Earl of Burlington and William Kent.
 The Palladian Dormitory at Westminster School in London is designed by Richard Boyle.
 Fountain of Ahmed III (Üsküdar) completed.

Awards
 Grand Prix de Rome, architecture: Joseph Eustache de Bourge.

Births
 February 6 – Giuseppe Venanzio Marvuglia, Sicilian architect (died 1814)
 June 29 (bapt.) – Thomas Atkinson, English architect working in Yorkshire (died 1798)
 November 5 – Martín de Aldehuela, Spanish architect (died 1802)
 November 24 – Jean-François Leroy, French architect (died 1791)
 Approximate date – Joseph Turner, Welsh-born architect (died 1807)

Deaths
 September 13 – Colen Campbell, Scottish-born architect (born 1676)

References

architecture
Years in architecture
18th-century architecture